Hello Mr. Billionaire is a 2018 Chinese comedy film directed by Fei Yan and Damo Peng, loosely based on the 1902 novel Brewster's Millions, and the 1985 film of the same name. It was released in China on 27 July 2018. It is a remake of Indian Movie Maalamaal released in 1988

Plot
A lousy goalie gets a mission: spend CN¥ 1 billion in thirty days. If he succeeds, he will get CN¥30 billion. However, he is not allowed to tell anyone about his mission, and he must not own any valuables at the end. In the end it is revealed that the true way to earn the money was to save his love's life, which he ends up doing.

Cast
Shen Teng
Vivian Sung
Zhang Yiming 
Chang Yuan (actor)
Wang Leehom (himself)

Reception

Box office
The film has earned  at the Chinese box office, making it one of the highest-grossing Chinese films of the year as well as the twelfth highest-grossing film there.

References

Chinese comedy films
2018 comedy films
Films directed by Fei Yan
Films directed by Da-Mo Peng
Films shot in Fujian